The Courthouse of American Samoa, formerly Administration Building, Navy No. 21, is a historic building near Pago Pago Harbor in Fagatogo, American Samoa.  It is a two-story wood-frame building mounted on concrete piers, with a two-story veranda on three sides.  A concrete vault is located at the back of the building.  The court house was reported by the local commander to have been completed about 1904.  It housed the offices and other facilities from which the United States Navy administered the island from its construction until 1952, and was where advisory councils (or fono) of the island's indigenous leaders were held.  The building is one of the oldest standing in American Samoa, having survived typhoons and other perils.

The building was added to the National Register of Historic Places in 1974.

Description and Historic Significance 
The Historical Commission could not find any record showing the exact time the Courthouse was erected. In July 1890, however, a careful research was conducted of the U.S. Navy’s projects and activities in American Samoa. Rear Admiral Kimberly U.S.N. was ordered to administer the survey of an establishment of a U.S. Coaling Station in Pago Pago. The following report is, therefore, based on the results of this research.

The Navy Department on August 5, 1898, commanded Civil Engineer Frank T. Chamber U.S.N., to advance to American Samoa for duty in connection with the erection of a wharf, a coal house, and other buildings at Pago Pago, Tutuila. The Commission is completely persuaded that the Courthouse was one of the establishments which were built under Chamber’s mission.

In March 1899, the Navy Department ordered Commander B.F. Tilley, U.S.N., Commanding Officer of the USS Abarenda (AC-13) which reached Pago Pago in the same year, to regard the instructions issued to the Civil Engineer Chamber. At the same time, the incumbent President of the United States sent several Americans to help with the construction of the wharf and buildings. Two of these men were Mr. Charles C. King and Mr. Joseph J. Jewett. Admiral Tilley who on 07 December 1899 left for Auckland, New Zealand to get materials for the implementation of the wharf and the buildings.

The Navy Department was notified on 25 July 1900 by the U.S. Post Office Department that a Post Office had been authorized at the U.S. Naval Station, Pago Pago, Tutuila. The Post Office was opened on 01 October 1900. Mrs. Hudson who was the wife of Chief Boatswain Hudson, U.S.N. became in-charge of the post office. She became the first Postmaster for Tutuila which is now known as American Samoa. Underneath the earliest Samoan hospital, the Post Office was built at Malaloa. 40 or 50 feet to the Pago Pago side of the Post Office stood Jewett’s house.   

E.W. Gurr was a New Zealand lawyer and barrister. He was appointed by the Commandant as Secretary to the Commandant and also as Judge and Legal Adviser on 4 August 1900. Gurr’s  services with the government of the island came to an end in 1908.

Interviews with a number of people whose ages from 55 to 93 years in both American Samoa and Western Samoa, denoted that the Courthouse took about three years to complete; and that numerous people from Western Samoa worked as carpenters in its construction.

When the Civil Engineer Chamber was assigned to erect the wharf, coal house and other buildings in Pago Pago in 1898, to October 1, 1900 when the first U.S. Post Office was opened by Mrs. Hudson, to the tour of duty of Commander E. B. Underwood, U.S. Navy, which started on May 5, 1903 and ended on 20 January 1905. It would be a close estimation that the construction of the Courthouse began some time in 1900 and completed either in the last part of 1903 or early in 1904. In arriving at this time estimate, the Commission also considered the employment of Mr. Gurr as a judge in August, 1900. He presided over cases which were held in nowhere else but the Courthouse for the Commission found no records to show that early trials had been held elsewhere.

After the completion of construction of the Courthouse, it was used at the time of the administration of the U.S. Navy, to house the offices of the Commandant-Governor, Chaplain, Disbursing Officer, Library, Aide to the Governor, in the upper floor. In the ground floor, there were offices of the Judge (who was also the Secretary of Native Affairs), the Attorney General, the Prosecutor, the Head of the Police Department), the Court Clerk, the Tax and Passport Clerk, the captain of the yard, and one spacious Courtroom.

Additionally, the Courtroom was used as an Assembly Hall or Meeting Place for the chiefs, leaders, and representatives from each village, county, and district of Tutuila and Manua, for their annual meetings called the FONO. This continued until the Enlisted Men’s barracks was assigned to the Legislature of American Samoa in 1954.

At present, the Courthouse is assigned to the exclusive use of the Court, or Judicial Department. It accommodates 2 papalagi Justice (Chief and Associate), and five Samoan judges. The building has two additional court rooms now, the old one is court room no. 1.

It is amazing that the Courthouse, one of the oldest buildings in American Samoa, has withstood the 20th Century in such good shape. It has been through a couple of World Wars, dozens of hurricanes, thousands of inches of tropical torrential downpours, millions of ants and cockroaches, termites and bugs.

See also
National Register of Historic Places listings in American Samoa

References

Buildings and structures in American Samoa
Courthouses in the United States
American Samoa law
Tutuila
Government buildings completed in 1904
Buildings and structures on the National Register of Historic Places in American Samoa
Historic district contributing properties in American Samoa